Mount Riley is a mountain, 2,100 m, standing along the northeast side of Long Valley, just west of California Plateau, in the Queen Maud Mountains. Mapped by United States Geological Survey (USGS) from surveys and U.S. Navy air photos, 1960–64. Named by Advisory Committee on Antarctic Names (US-ACAN) for LTJG Stephen G. Riley, photographic officer with U.S. Navy Squadron VX-6 on Operation Deep Freeze 1966 and 1967.
 

Mountains of Marie Byrd Land